Ann Brockman (1896–1943) was an American painter.

An oil and watercolor painter, Brockman, who was known for her depictions of the landscape, the coastline, the figure, and animals, was born in Alameda, California in 1899. She studied with painters Gifford Beal and John Sloan at the Art Students League of New York. Over the years, she exhibited at the Pennsylvania Academy of the Fine Arts, in Philadelphia, and with the Society of Independent Artists, and Salons of America in New York City. She was an instructor at the Cape Ann School of Art at Rockport, Massachusetts, and spent much time painting in that location and on Cape Cod. She died in New York. The United States Department of State owns examples of her work, as does the Smithsonian American Art Museum.  A memorial exhibition was held at the Kraushaar Galleries three years after her death.

References

1896 births
1943 deaths
American women painters
American watercolorists
20th-century American painters
20th-century American women artists
Art Students League of New York alumni
Painters from California
People from Alameda, California
Women watercolorists